Josa i Tuixén or Josa i Tuixent is a municipality in the comarca of the Alt Urgell in Catalonia, Spain. It is situated on the southern side of the Pyrenean range of Serra del Cadí in the east of the comarca. The ajuntament (town hall) is located in Tuixén. Local roads link the municipality with La Seu d'Urgell and with Sant Llorenç de Morunys. It is a centre for Nordic skiing.

Subdivisions 
As the name suggests, the municipality of Josa i Tuixén comprises two villages that were two independent municipalities until 1973. Populations are given as of 2013:
Josa de Cadí - 25
Tuixent - 116

Demography

References

 Panareda Clopés, Josep Maria; Rios Calvet, Jaume; Rabella Vives, Josep Maria (1989). Guia de Catalunya, Barcelona: Caixa de Catalunya.  (Spanish).  (Catalan).

External links
Official website 
 Government data pages 
Information - Consell comarcal 

Municipalities in Alt Urgell
Populated places in Alt Urgell